Anton Bruckner's Symphony No. 2 in C minor, sometimes known as the "Symphony of Pauses", was completed in 1872. It was actually the fourth symphony composed by Bruckner, after the Symphony in F minor (1863), the Symphony No. 1 in C minor (1866), and the Symphony in D minor (1869).

History 
In the fall of 1871, after having become established in Vienna, Anton Bruckner embarked on a new symphonic project, his fourth, which in less than a year would result in a completed and copied score of nearly 2000 bars. The Symphony No. 2, which was mostly written in the summer of 1872, represents a breakthrough in Bruckner's conception of the symphony. Although Bruckner had been composing sonata-form movements with three distinct themes since he began writing symphonies in 1862, in 1872 he greatly expanded the scope of their presentation and development, and established the framework, which he would use consistently in all of his subsequent symphonic work. Moreover, the Adagio of this symphony is in ABA′B′A″ Lied form followed by a coda – the framework which Bruckner would use in his subsequent symphonic work, with exception of the Sixth.

The Second Symphony is the only numbered Bruckner symphony without a dedication; Franz Liszt tacitly rejected the dedication, and Richard Wagner chose the Symphony No. 3 in D minor when offered both works. The symphony was planned to be performed in the same year by the Vienna Philharmonic under Otto Dessoff. However, the rehearsal did not lead to a performance, because Dessoff and a number of players considered it impossible to perform. Nevertheless, the symphony was premiered the following year, on 26 October 1873, by the Vienna Philharmonic with Bruckner himself on the podium.

Description 
The score calls for a pair each of flutes, oboes, clarinets, bassoons, four horns, two trumpets, three trombones, timpani, and strings.

The symphony has four movements. In the first version (1872) they are:

In the second version (1877) they are:

The description below will use the tempo markings of the latter version.

First movement 

The symphony opens with tremolo strings and the lyrical main theme emerges from under this:

Note that although there is tremolo, it is a somewhat slower tremolo than what Bruckner would employ in later symphonies. Shortly after this, an "enigmatic" trumpet call appears:

This rhythm is an important device and will recur throughout the movement. The first theme group closes with one of the symphony's characteristic pauses and leads to the second theme group in E flat major:

The third theme group is also in E major:

The trumpet call from the first group recurs here. The movement heads into its development after a brief codetta. The recapitulation opens just as the exposition did; with tremolo strings giving way to the main theme and the reappearance of the trumpet call. At the end, there is a brief recollection of the main theme before a grand peroration closes the movement. The first part of the coda is cut in the second version.

Andante/Adagio (Third in 1872) 

This movement opens quietly with the strings:

This movement is the first Bruckner slow movement in five-part ternary form and so this part will recur twice. The second part of the movement begins with pizzicato strings introducing a new theme on the horns:

The second part was cut roughly in half in the second version. The latter half contained a decorated restatement of the horn theme. However, the fourth part of the movement contains a similar (But not identical) passage in both versions. Near the end of the movement, Bruckner quotes from the Benedictus of his F minor Mass before the main theme begins the coda:

Scherzo (Second in 1872) 
In the first version, both sections of the Scherzo and both sections of the Trio are repeated. These repeats were excised in the second version. The Scherzo is based on rhythmic theme heard at the outset:

The Trio is based on a "tipsy" melody in the violas:

Fourth movement 

The movement opens quietly with the second violins playing an eighth-note accompaniment and the first violins playing a descending scale:

This leads to the second theme of the first theme group, a loud passage given by the full orchestra that will recur as the main theme of the third theme group:

The quiet opening returns after this and leads into the A major second theme group, called "Schubertian" by Georg Tintner:

The exposition closes with a quote of the Kyrie of the F minor Mass. The development contains what William Carragan refers to as "fantasies" on the first and second theme groups. The recapitulation begins with the loud secondary theme of the first group before moving into the quieter first theme. Among other cuts between versions, one of note is in the coda of the movement. In the original version the coda is in two phases; a buildup leading to quotations of the first movement and the second theme group of this movement. This leads to the second phase, another buildup leading to the grand peroration in C major that closes the symphony. The first of these phases is cut in the second version, leaving only the final buildup and peroration.

Versions 
The composer made two versions of this symphony recognised by the Internationale Bruckner-Gesellschaft (1872 and 1877). The work was also adjusted by the composer right before its premiere, as well as in 1876 and 1892.

First version, 1872 
This was published in a edition by William Carragan under the auspices of the Internationale Bruckner-Gesellschaft in 2005. The Scherzo comes second; the slow movement follows. Georg Tintner: "Bruckner's mania for revision sometimes bore positive fruits ... [but with] the Second and the Third [symphonies] his first versions seem to me the best."

1873 revision 
Bruckner made adjustments preparing for the 1873 premiere.
 First movement: Rhythmic trombones were added on bars 129–135 and 446–452.
 Adagio: In the fifth section a solo violin was added from bar 150 to bar 164. During the rehearsal, violin soloist Heinz Haunold told: "... the violin solo at that point of the movement effectively prevented the orchestra from rising to the great climax ... but it also contained a fatal trap for the performers of the symphony."
The violin solo ... in duple quarters and duple eighths, ... together with the rhythmic complexities already caused by the shift from sextuplets to quintuplets in the first violins, ... must have created an amazingly detailed sound – not to say an impenetrable musical fog."
In the coda, the solo horn, which was considered unplayable by the horn-player, was replaced by the first clarinet and the viola section.
 Scherzo: The repeats were deleted.
 Finale: A "very dissonant section of the development", which includes at one point a striking alternation of short viola notes with pizzicato chords in the rest of the strings, was removed. These original bold and adventurous bars 305–360 were substituted for a new, 24-bar, very charming "" (new passage).In the peroration, a fourth trombone is added to enhance the contrabass part.

1876 revision 
In 1876, Bruckner made additional, smaller changes prior the second performance, which occurred on 20 February 1876 in the Musikvereinsaal under Bruckner's baton.For the performance of 1876, the inner movements were not altered, the violin solo in the Adagio was kept, and the internal Scherzo repeats remained cancelled. In the first movement, a cut was made in the coda. In the Finale, the fantasy on the second theme following the “Neuer Satz” was made more concise, a cut was also made in the coda, the peroration was recomposed and the additional trombone was removed.

Second Version, 1877 
Bruckner crossed out the second half of section 2 of the slow movement, judged too difficult for the solo horn – with, as a result, an imbalance in the structure of the movement – and re-orchestrated its section 5. He also made additional cuts in the first movement and the Finale, and dropped the "Neuer Satz" and substituted it for an 18-bar long, new material.
 Haas edition (1938): this edition is based on the 1877 version, with, however, some features of the first version.
 Nowak edition (1965): this edition still contains residues of the Haas' "mixed version" - among others an error in the trumpet parts at the end of the first movement:
 Carragan edition (2007): this edition is a critical edition of the 1877 version of the symphony. Carragan explained its origin: "After a bit of discussion, Hofrat Nowak asked me to prepare a new edition of the symphony for the Collected Edition, knowing, as many others did as well, that he had not dealt fully with the problems of the Haas edition in 1965."
In his edition Carragan put the crossed-out second half of section 2 of the slow movement (bars 48–69) as optional, explaining, "In my edition of the Second I kept that music in the score, and borrowing from Haas marked it with a 'vide', to be retained at the conductor's option. In the preface I point out that if the pure 1877 version of the symphony is desired, the cut must be made, but some conductors are keeping the music and in my opinion as a listener, the effect is better."

1892 edition 
This, the first published edition of the symphony, was prepared by Cyrill Hynais and was until recently thought to be inauthentic, but Carragan has shown that it corresponds closely to the 1877 version. This first edition was performed on 25 November 1894 by the Vienna Philharmonic under Hans Richter.

Discography 
The first recording of any part of the symphony was made by Fritz Zaun with the Berlin State Opera Orchestra in 1934: a cut version of the Scherzo in the 1892 first published edition. The oldest surviving complete performance is by Georg-Ludwig Jochum with the Bruckner Orchestra of Linz, dating from 1944 and using the Haas edition. The first commercial recording was by Volkmar Andreae with the Vienna Symphony Orchestra in 1953, also using the Haas edition.

First version, 1872

Carragan's edition 
 Kurt Eichhorn conducting the Bruckner Orchestra Linz, 1991 (first recording, using a pre-publ. Carragan ed.), Camerata 15CM-379 & 30CM-195
 Georg Tintner conducting the RTÉ National Symphony Orchestra, 1996 (using a pre-publ. Carragan ed.), Naxos
 Simone Young conducting the Hamburg Philharmonic Orchestra, 2006, BMG SACD
 Gerd Schaller conducting the Philharmonie Festiva, live recording, 2011, Profil PH 12022
 Herbert Blomstedt conducting the Leipzig Gewandhaus Orchestra, 2012, Querstand SACD
 Rémy Ballot conducting the Saint-Florian Altomonte Orchestra, 2019, Gramola Hybrid SACD 99211

1873 variant 
 Kurt Eichhorn conducting the Bruckner Orchestra Linz, 1991, Camerata 30CM-196

1876 variant 
 Kurt Eichhorn conducting the Bruckner Orchestra Linz, abruckner.com BSVD-0103
NB: composite recording prepared in 2007 by William Carragan and John Berky, using three Camarata recordings (15CM-380, 30CM-195 and 30CM-196) conducted by Kurt Eichhorn

Second version, 1877

Haas's (mixed) edition 
 Franz Konwitschny conducting the Berlin Radio Symphony Orchestra, live recording, 1951, Berlin Classics
 Erich Schmid conducting the Southwest German Radio Symphony Orchestra, studio recording, 1965, Ampex
 Horst Stein conducting the Vienna Philharmonic Orchestra, studio recording, 1973, Decca/London
 Günter Wand conducting the Cologne Radio Symphony Orchestra, studio recording, 1981, RCA
 Christoph Eschenbach conducting the Houston Symphony Orchestra, live recording, 1996, Koch  Nowak's edition 
 Carlo Maria Giulini conducting the Vienna Symphony Orchestra, studio recording, 1974, Testament
 Eugen Jochum conducting the Staatskapelle Dresden, studio recording, 1980, EMI
 Herbert von Karajan conducting the Berliner Philharmoniker, studio recording, 1981, Deutsche Grammophon
 Stanisław Skrowaczewski conducting the Saarbrücken Radio Symphony Orchestra, studio recording, 1999, Arte Nova/Oehms Classics
 Hiroshi Wakasugi conducting the Saarbrücken Radio Symphony Orchestra, studio recording, 2004, Arte Nova
 Thomas Dausgaard conducting the Swedish Chamber Orchestra, studio recording, 2010, BIS

 Carragan's edition 
Daniel Barenboim conducting the Berlin Philharmonic Orchestra, 1997 (using a pre-publ. Carragan ed.) - Teldec CD 3984 21485-2

A few other recent recordings use also the Carragan's edition:
 Paavo Järvi with the Frankfurt Radio Symphony Orchestra - Sony SACD SICC 10218, 2011NB: in the coda of Adagio the clarinet is replaced by a horn
 Mario Venzago with the Northern Sinfonia - CPO 777 735-2, 2011
 Daniel Barenboim with the Staatskapelle Berlin - DG Set 479 6985, 2012
 Marek Janowski with the Orchestre de la Suisse Romande - Pentatone Classics SACD PTC 5186 448, 2012

 1892 edition 
A few recordings use this first edition:
 Hermann Scherchen conducting the Toronto Symphony Orchestra, 1965, Disco Archivia CD - with a large cut (bars 388-512) in the Finale
 Cristian Mandeal conducting the Cluj-Napoca Philharmonic Orchestra - Electrecord LP ST-ECE 02731/32/33, 1984
 Hun-Joung Lim conducting the Korean Symphony Orchestra, 2016, Decca

 References 

 Sources 
 Anton Bruckner, Sämtliche Werke, Kritische Gesamtausgabe – Band 2: II. Symphonie c-Moll (Originalfassung), Musikwissenschaftlicher Verlag der internationalen Bruckner-Gesellschaft, Robert Haas (editor), Vienna, 1938
 Anton Bruckner: Sämtliche Werke: Band II: II. Symphonie c-Moll, Musikwissenschaftlicher Verlag der Internationalen Bruckner-Gesellschaft, Vienna
 II/1:  Fassung 1872, William Carragan (editor), 2005
 II/2:  Fassung 1877'', Leopold Nowak (editor), 1965; new edition by William Carragan, 2007

External links 
 Anton Bruckner Critical Complete Edition – Symphony No. 2 in C minor
 
 Full score (Haas/1877) at the Indiana University School of Music
 Bruckner Symphony versions by David Griegel
 Complete discography of the symphony by John Berky
 Eighty Years of the Bruckner Second, William Carragan
 Essay on the editions of Symphony No. 2 by Benjamin-Gunnar Cohrs

Symphony 02
Compositions in C minor
1872 compositions